Payam Ghobadi Oughaz (born 17 May 1989 in Tehran) is Iranian-born Azerbaijani taekwondo practitioner who currently plays for the Azerbaijani national taekwondo team.

Like his teammates like Milad Beigi, after emigrating from Iran, he became a member of the national taekwondo team of Azerbaijan and continues his sports career in this team.

Sporting achievements

References

External links 

 
 Payam Ghobadi on TaekwondoData

Living people
1989 births
Azerbaijani male taekwondo practitioners
Iranian male taekwondo practitioners
Sportspeople from Tehran
Iranian emigrants to Azerbaijan